Hong Kong Coliseum, commonly known as the Hung Hom Coliseum, is a multi-purpose indoor arena, in Hung Hom Bay, Kowloon, Hong Kong near Hung Hom station. It is in Yau Tsim Mong District.

It was built by the Urban Council and inaugurated on 27 April 1983. The opening of the stadium coincided with the 100th anniversary of the Urban Council. The coliseum has 12,500 seats, which is the second largest among indoor facilities in Hong Kong, only behind the 2005-opened AsiaWorld–Arena.

It is now managed by the Leisure and Cultural Service Department of the Hong Kong Government.

Facilities
The Hong Kong Coliseum consists of a big arena and a number of conference rooms.

Arena
 
The arena is rectangular with sides 41m each, with a concrete cement flooring.

During performances, the floor may be covered with different 
overmounted floorings, such as demountable wooden flooring or various rubberized roll-outs, to facilitate the set-up of sporting equipment and the playing of different sporting activities such as futsal, badminton, basketball, volleyball and ice-skating.

Moreover, the floor can hold strong pressures up to 1,800 kg/m2, which cannot even be done by industrial buildings. This facilitates the set up of stages, platforms and sound equipments during concerts and other concert-like performances that requires an elevated stage and good PA (public address) systems.

Different technical equipments and a 4-side colour television projection system are also present to project the performer's image onto a screen, so that audience sitting around the rear side of the stadium can also see clearly.

Conference Rooms
The Hong Kong Coliseum offers both open and sheltered areas for holding conventions and conferences. The demountable open stage provides the arena with an excellent forum for public assemblies as well as staging live television broadcasts of opening ceremonies.

Reception Room
The reception room acts as an assistant facility for hirers of the arena and the conference rooms to accommodate visiting VIPs. The room can hold 60 persons.

Events
Even though its formal name in Chinese roughly translates to "Sports Arena", the venue often serves as a concert venue for popular singers. In addition, some universities rent it every year for congregation. Some performances like ice-skating also choose Hong Kong Coliseum as their stages. It was also used every year from 1991 to 2010 to hold the Miss Hong Kong Pageant, except for 2008.

It also hosts a part of the FIVB Volleyball Women's Nations League (before: FIVB World Grand Prix) for volleyball every year.

David Bowie played the two final dates of his 1983 Serious Moonlight Tour at the venue. The final date - December 8 - was the third anniversary of John Lennon's death and to signify that, Bowie played Lennon's "Imagine".

On 3 June 2001, Irish vocal pop band Westlife held a concert for their Where Dreams Come True Tour supporting their album Coast to Coast.
In November 1988 it was a venue for three days (18-20th) of Whitney Houston's Moment of Truth World Tour  performance. Other performers at the Coliseum in the late eighties/early ninety's included Stevie Wonder, Phil Collins, and Kylie Minogue.

Venue for 2009 East Asian Games
The Hong Kong Coliseum was one of the venues for the 5th East Asian Games that was hosted in Hong Kong in 2009.

Accident
On 28 July 2022, during a concert by local boy band, Mirror, a movable elevated giant TV screen fell from the ceiling of the venue and landed directly on a dancer's head, and further collapsing onto another dancer. Both dancers were sent to hospital, with one being in serious condition in the ICU while the other being stable. All remaining concerts had to be cancelled and investigations were called by the government.

See also
 Hong Kong Esports Festival

References

External links

Landmarks in Hong Kong
Hung Hom
Indoor arenas in Hong Kong
Music venues in Hong Kong
Volleyball venues in China
Badminton venues
Inverted pyramids
Pyramids in China
Taekwondo venues
Sports venues completed in 1981